A plafond (French for "ceiling"), in a broad sense, is a (flat, vaulted or dome) ceiling.

A plafond can be a product of monumental painting or sculpture. Picturesque plafonds can be painted directly on plaster (as a fresco, oil, glutinous, synthetic paints), on a canvas attached to a ceiling (panel), or a mosaic.

As a decorative feature of churches and staterooms, plafonds were popular from the 17th century until the beginning of the 19th century.  Designs of this period typically used illusionistic ceiling painting showing the architectural structure behind, strongly foreshortened figures, architectural details, and/or the open sky.

References